Henry Justin Lallier (21 June 1823 - 12 August 1873) was the producer in 1862 of the first printed stamp album.

References

External links 
1863 Original Stamp Collection in a Lallier Album

1823 births
1873 deaths
Philately
19th-century French people
Nationality missing
Place of birth missing
Place of death missing